Ashrafabad-e Quch (also Romanized as Ashrafābād-e Qūch; also known as Ashrafābād) is a village in Khosrowabad Rural District, Chang Almas District, Bijar County, Kurdistan Province, Iran. At the 2006 census, its population was 173, in 40 families. The village is populated by Kurds.

References 

Towns and villages in Bijar County
Kurdish settlements in Kurdistan Province